Marcos Boris Rotman (December 4, 1924 – July 11, 2021) was a Chilean American immunologist–molecular biologist and professor emeritus of Medical Science at Alpert Medical School of Brown University.  He is widely recognized for performing the first single molecule experiments in biology. He died in July 2021 at the age of 96.

Education 
Rotman attended elementary and high school at the Instituto Nacional of Chile.  In 1942, he won a scholarship to attend the Universidad Técnica Federico Santa Maria, from where he graduated with a chemical engineering degree in 1948. In 1950, he entered the University of Illinois and in 1952 earned a PhD in biochemistry/microbiology. His mentors at University of Illinois were Salvador E. Luria (Nobel laureate 1969) and Sol Spiegelman (Albert Lasker Award for Basic Medical Research, 1974).  After graduation, Rotman was a postdoctoral researcher in the group of Joshua Lederberg (Nobel laureate 1958) at University of Wisconsin-Madison, and later, in the laboratory of Bernard D. Davis at Harvard Medical School.

Research career 
In 1961, Rotman developed a system capable of measuring the enzymatic activity of individual molecules of beta-galactosidase and used it to conduct the first single-molecule experiment in biology.

These early experiments remained obscure for more than 30 years, but they are now recognized as pioneering and highly influential. A review states, "Indeed, this paper is the origin not only of the field of single-molecule enzymology, but also of much subsequent single-molecule research." The significance of single-molecule experiments derives from their capacity to provide fundamental insights that are not attainable by conventional experimentation. For example (a) Enzyme turnover can be measured directly from the number of fluorescent molecules of product produced by an individual enzyme molecule. (b) Studying heat inactivation of an enzyme at the single molecule level uncovered unprecedented mechanisms. Namely, heating causes an all-or-none distribution of enzymatic activity, i. e., the molecular population consists of either fully active or completely inactive enzyme molecules. This experiment rules out an alternative plausible mechanism postulating that partial heat inactivation produces enzyme molecules with partial activity; (c) In contrast, partial inactivation of beta-galactosidase resulting from storing crystalline enzyme under ammonium sulfate at low temperature (3-6 °C) for several years, causes a uniform distribution of partially inactivated enzyme molecules, (d) A point mutation in the lacZ gene alters beta-galactosidase activity producing uniform populations of beta-galactosidase molecules with individual partial activity.

It is noteworthy that the first single-molecule experiment utilized two innovative technologies, droplet-based microfluidics and fluorogenic substrates. The former was developed by J. F. Collins to measure penicillinase content of individual Bacillus licheniformis. The latter, fluorogenic substrates are non-fluorescent compounds yielding fluorescent products upon enzymatic action. Fluorogenic substrates serve to increase the sensitivity of enzyme assays and many are commercially available.

In 1966, Rotman and Papermaster discovered fluorochromasia, a universal cellular phenomenon characterized by the immediate appearance of bright green fluorescence inside viable cells upon exposure to certain membrane permeable fluorogenic substrates such as fluorescein diacetate, fluorescein dibutyrate, and fluorescein dipropionate. The phenomenon is commonly used to measure cellular viability of many different species including animals, embryos, plants, and microorganisms.

In 1968, Rotman and Celada reported existence of a subset of antibodies with the unprecedented ability to restore the activity of mutated molecules of defective beta-galactosidase by conformational change.  Subsequently, this exceptional ability of some antibodies has been subject of many studies.

Awards 
In 1990, Rotman received the State of Rhode Island Governor's Award for Scientific Excellence.

Selected publications

References 

1924 births
2021 deaths
American immunologists
Brown University faculty
Instituto Nacional General José Miguel Carrera alumni
People from Buenos Aires
University of Illinois alumni
Argentine emigrants to Chile
Chilean emigrants to the United States